The anterior auricular veins are veins which drain the anterior aspect of the external ear. The veins drains to the superficial temporal vein.

See also
 Posterior auricular vein

References

Veins of the head and neck